Gain is a novel by Richard Powers published by in 1998. It tells the stories of Clare International, a chemical conglomerate with origins in soap manufacturing in the early 18th century, and Laura Bodey, a 42-year-old divorcée living near Clare International's headquarters who develops ovarian cancer. It won the James Fenimore Cooper Prize for Best Historical Fiction in 1999.

External links
Bibliography of editions
Listing of reviews and writings

1998 American novels
Novels by Richard Powers
James Fenimore Cooper Prize-winning works
Farrar, Straus and Giroux books